Joseph Honoré Gérald Fauteux  (October 22, 1900 – September 14, 1980) was the 13th Chief Justice of Canada from 1970 to 1973.

Born in Saint-Hyacinthe, Quebec, the son of Homère Fauteux and Héva Mercier, he studied at the Université de Montréal and graduated with an LL.L in 1925. Called to the bar that year, he settled in Montreal, where he practised with his uncle, Honoré Mercier Jr., forming the law firm of Mercier & Fauteux.  From 1930 to 1936, he was Crown Prosecutor for Montreal, and in 1939 he became Chief Crown Prosecutor of the province of Quebec.

In 1946 he was a legal adviser with the Royal Commission on Spying Activities in Canada. He taught criminal law as a sessional lecturer at McGill University for 14 years and was the dean of the Faculty of Law from 1949 to 1950. In 1947 he was appointed  to the Quebec Superior Court and to the Supreme Court of Canada  on December 22, 1949. He was also one of the founders of the University of Ottawa's law faculty, serving as dean from 1953 to 1962. He was appointed the Chancellor of the University of Ottawa in 1973. On March 23, 1970, he was named Chief Justice of Canada, retiring on December 23, 1973, having served for 24 years on the court, four as Chief Justice. In 1974 he was made a Companion of the Order of Canada.  Fauteux Hall which houses the Faculty of Law at the University of Ottawa is named after him.

Chief Justice Fauteux died on September 14, 1980, at the age of 79 and was interred in the Notre Dame des Neiges Cemetery in Montreal.

His brother was the politician Gaspard Fauteux.

References

External links 
 Supreme Court of Canada biography
 Order of Canada Citation

1900 births
1980 deaths
Chancellors of the University of Ottawa
Chief justices of Canada
Justices of the Supreme Court of Canada
Companions of the Order of Canada
French Quebecers
People from Saint-Hyacinthe
Lawyers in Quebec
Université de Montréal alumni
20th-century Canadian lawyers
Université de Montréal Faculty of Law alumni
Academic staff of the University of Ottawa
Burials at Notre Dame des Neiges Cemetery